Sylvanite is a census-designated place (CDP) in Lincoln County, Montana, United States. The population was 103 at the 2010 census.

The community is in Kootenai National Forest in northwestern Lincoln County, in the valley of the Yaak River, a south-flowing tributary of the Kootenai River. Yaak River Road (National Forest Road 92) runs through the valley, leading south  to U.S. Route 2 in the Kootenai valley and northeast (upriver)  to Yaak.

Demographics

References

Census-designated places in Lincoln County, Montana
Census-designated places in Montana